Oro Jr. is a Mexican luchador enmascarado, or masked professional wrestler currently working for the Mexican professional wrestling promotion Consejo Mundial de Lucha Libre (CMLL) portraying a tecnico ("Good guy") wrestling character. Oro Jr.'s real name is not a matter of public record, as is often the case with masked wrestlers in Mexico where their private lives are kept a secret from the wrestling fans. It has been revealed that he is a third-generation wrestler, part of the Hernández family that also included his uncle Oro (whom his ring name is taken from) as well as his father Plata and uncles Oro II, Plata II, Bronce II, El Calavera Jr. and Golden.

Personal life
The man known under the ring name Oro Jr. is a third-generation wrestler; he is the son of Ismael Hernández Solís who worked under the ring name Plata ("Silver") and the nephew of Jesús Javier Hernández Solís who worked as a professional wrestler under the name Oro ("Gold") until his death following a professional wrestling match. His extended family are all connected with wrestling, including uncles Oro II, Plata II, Bronce II, El Calavera Jr., and Golden, grandfather Calavera I and great uncle Calavera II. Oro Jr. never knew his uncle as he was too young when Oro died in 1993 but heard so much about him from his father and uncles that he was inspired by him to become a professional wrestler, adopting the name "Oro Jr." in his honor instead of "Plata Jr." after his father's ring name.

Professional wrestling career
In Lucha Libre it is traditional to keep the true identify of a masked wrestler a secret, not revealing their real names and oftentimes not revealing what previous ring names they have competed under. No previous ring identities have been confirmed for Oro Jr. and it has been stated that his Consejo Mundial de Lucha Libre (CMLL) debut was also his professional wrestling debut, but with the traditions of Lucha Libre it is entirely possible that his debut date is for that of his ring character, not him personally, which means could have  worked under other names before this. Oro Jr. was introduced to the wrestling crowd the same night his uncle, Oro II lost a Luchas de Apuestas, or bet match and had to remove his mask after the match. Oro Jr. made his CMLL in-ring debut on August 14, 2012, teaming with Fresbee losing to the team of Apocalipsis and Camorra in the first match of the night. He was introduced as part of Generacion 2012 a few weeks later. Generacion 2012 included Herodes Jr., Taurus, Genesis, Guerrero Negro Jr., Espanto Jr., and Akuma. In March 2013 Oro Jr. was one of 18 wrestlers who competed in the annual Torneo Sangre Nueva ("New Blood Tournament"), a tournament for young or low ranking wrestlers. He competed in qualifying block B on March 5, 2013, for a place in the finals; the other wrestlers in Block B included Genesis, Robin, Sensei, Super Halcón Jr., Disturbio, Guerrero Negro Jr., Inquisidor, Taurus, and Zayco who competed in a torneo cibernetico, multi-man elimination match. Oro Jr. was the fifth man eliminated overall when he was pinned by Disturbio. In late March, 2013 Oro Jr. was announced as one of the Novatos, or rookies, in the 2013 Torneo Gran Alternativa, or "Great Alternative tournament". The Gran Alternativa pairs a rookie with an experienced wrestler for a tag team tournament. Oro Jr. teamed up with Mascara Dorada for the tournament, but the duo lost their first round match on April 12, to Guerrero Negro Jr. and Último Guerrero. On March 24, 2014 Oro Jr. was one of 16 men competing for a spot in the 2014 En Busca de un Ídolo ("In Search of an Idol") tournament. During the torneo cibernetico elimination match Oro Jr. dove onto Metálico and landed poorly, hurting Metálico in the process. When Metálico returned from his injury a month later he teamed up with Oro Jr., during which he began to argue with Oro Jr. after a move went wrong once again. The following week Metálico turned Rudo for the first time in his career as he attacked Oro Jr. at the end of a match against Canelo Casas, Disturbio and El Rebelde. After the match Metálico stated that he blamed Oro Jr. for the shoulder injury that kept him out of the ring. In subsequent weeks the two faced off on multiple occasions, often with Metálico stealing Oro Jr.'s mask. On August 4, following another trios match with Oro and Metálico CMLL announced that the two would face off in a Lucha de Apuestas ("Bet match") on August 10, where both wrestlers will bet their wrestling masks on the outcome of the match. Oro Jr. defeated Metálico for his first Lucha de Apuestas win.

The Hernández wrestling family
The Hernández family has been in the professional wrestling business for three generations, starting with the brothers collectively known as Los Hermanos Calavera ("The Skull Brothers"). Their six sons and one grandson (Oro Jr.) either are or have been professional wrestlers at some point.

Oro in lucha libre
Oro was the original luchador to use the name. He was such a popular wrestler and in-ring character that the name has been used by a number of other wrestlers since his death.
Oro II, his brother Ismael Hernández Solís. He worked under the ring name Plata before Oro's death, and changed his name in honor of his brother, although he only used the name until 1995.
Oro II (Second version), Ismael Hernández Islas, another brother who adopted the name and mask in 1995.
Orito, a Mini-Estrella version of Oro that was active before Oro's death.
Oro Jr. (I), Orito moved to the regular sized division and changed his name.

Luchas de Apuestas record

References

Living people
Masked wrestlers
Mexican male professional wrestlers
Professional wrestlers from Jalisco
People from Guadalajara, Jalisco
1992 births
Unidentified wrestlers